Dominik Cipf (born 30 January 2001) is a Hungarian football player who plays for Vasas.

Career

Budapest Honvéd
On 21 July 2018, Cipf played his first match for Budapest Honvéd in a 3-2 win against Szombathelyi Haladás in the Hungarian League.

Vasas
On 4 February 2022, Cipf signed with Vasas.

Club statistics

References

External links
 
 
 Honvéd 

2001 births
Living people
People from Kisvárda
Hungarian footballers
Association football forwards
Hungary youth international footballers
Budapest Honvéd FC players
BFC Siófok players
Vasas SC players
Nemzeti Bajnokság I players
Nemzeti Bajnokság II players
Sportspeople from Szabolcs-Szatmár-Bereg County